A. Kanan / Arkut Kannabhiran (18 June 1920 – 12 September 2004), more popularly known as A. Kanan, was an Indian vocalist in the Hindustani classical tradition and one of the legendary vocalist from Kirana Gharana. He is known for the khayal form of singing to which he lent his individuality.

Early life
Arkut Kannabhiran was born in Madras (present-day Chennai), in 1920. As he grew up he was interested in cricket as well as singing.

He began his professional career joining the railways at the age of 18. In his 20s, while in Bombay (present-day Mumbai) for a cricket match, he auditioned for the All India Radio station there. The auditioners were so impressed by his singing voice that they offered him a slot of air time. His job saw him posted at Hyderabad and here he began taking lessons in Hindustani classical music from Pandit Lahanu Babu Rao. Shortly after, he got transferred to Calcutta (now Kolkata) where he studied music with Girija Shankar Chakraborty. Subsequently, when his job required his transfer from Kolkata, he left the job and stayed on in the city. He later came in contact with the musician Amir Khan.

Career
Arkut Kannabhiran made his formal debut in the world of Hindustani style of classical vocal music in 1943, when he performed at the All Bengal Music Conference in Kolkata.
It was during his stay at Calcutta that he earned a name for himself by his melodious voice and a very personal style of gayaki that he developed. With his enormous acclaim he came to be better known as Pandit A.T. Kanan. Today few will remember Kanan by his original name. Kanan went on to become a regular on the All India Radio and was counted among top graded artists. His khayal renditions in Raga Jog, Rageshri, Bihag and Hansadhwani were popular all across the country. The acclaimed Bengali filmmaker Ritwik Ghatak used his fast khayal "Laagi Lagan Pati Sakhi Sang" set in Raga Hansadhwani in his classic film Meghe Dhaka Tara. Today not many of Kanan's recordings survive. But he will be always remembered for the master performance he gave for the film.

In the 1950s, along with other musicians, Kanan founded the Calcutta Music Circle. Several young students had the opportunity of learning Hindustani classical music from him and went on to make names for themselves in later lives.

He was a Guru at ITC Sangeet Research Academy.

Personal life
He was married to Malabika Kanan, another acclaimed Hindustani vocalist of the time.

Death
Arkut Kannabhiran died in 2004, aged 84, at Kolkata.

References

Hindustani singers
Recipients of the Sangeet Natak Akademi Award
Indian classical musicians of Bengal
1920 births
2004 deaths
20th-century Khyal singers
20th-century Indian male singers
20th-century Indian singers
Musicians from Kolkata
Musicians from Chennai